Puzzle Lake is a lake near Geneva in Seminole County, Florida. It forms the border of Volusia and Seminole counties. It is one of the lakes that make up the St. Johns River system.  north of the lake is the mouth of the tributary, the Econlockhatchee River.
Lake Harney, the start of the river becoming a wetland (upriver). It will become a narrow river again past Lake Poinsett in Brevard County. The lake is named after this because the navigable portions of the lake change seasonally depending on the amount of rainfall. When the waters recede, previously known boat routes can be hindered by new, submersed, sandbars and deep water channels that are completely different from the year before.

Geography 

On the lakes eastern boundary is Volusia and Brevard counties. To the north is the Econlockhatchee River and Lake Harney. To the northwest is Geneva, and to the south is Christmas.

Boaters beware of numerous fence posts and barbed wire.

See also 
Econlockhatchee River
State Road 46
St. Johns River
Lake Harney –  downriver
Ruth Lake (Florida) –  upriver

References 

Lakes of Seminole County, Florida
Lakes of Volusia County, Florida
St. Johns River
Econlockhatchee River
Lakes of Florida